Trade was a culturally important gay nightclub at Turnmills, Clerkenwell Road, London started in 1990 by Laurence Malice.<ref>Classic '90s' article by Harry Beynon (retrieved 25 October 2018) talks of Laurence Malice (of Trade club 1989) and his band Big Bang's involvement with the birth of Big Beat music genre in 1989: https://www.thestudentplaylist.com/the-prodigy-the-fat-of-the-land/</ref>

History
Early years 1990–1995
Trade originated as an underground club night beneath Turnmills pub in Clerkenwell Road. Trade was the second nightclub Laurence had run at Turnmills; his first was Xanadu, which he co-hosted with the club promoter Robert Pereno. Laurence was a member of the electronic music duo Big Bang when he opened Trade. The history of Trade is inextricably linked with the evolution of Turnmills as a club venue. Xanadu opened in early-1990 and ran on Saturday evenings from 10.00 pm to 2.30 am.
Iain, Laurence’s band partner in Big Bang, sold tickets on the door. Xanadu ran successfully for around 5-6 months. It was only after Turnmills owner John Newman decided to promote Saturday evenings himself that Laurence was offered the alternative timeslot from 3.00 am onwards on Sunday mornings, after John had secured an all-night license from Islington Council. Turnmills was the first London venue to be offered such a license. Laurence accepted the challenge. Thus, Trade was born on October 29, 1990, and, as such, became the capital's first legal after-hours club.

Initially, the club room beneath Turnmills pub was sparse with little or no décor. The space was dark, and a little unsavoury. Pushed into one corner was a beat up old grand piano. In later interviews, Laurence recalled, ‘Trade had been running on an underground tip for the first few months’ Three or four months into the residency, and still finding it difficult to pull in customers, Laurence took decisive action. ‘I invited Tim Stabler to co-promote it with me and oversee the décor in the club.’ At the time, other clubs such as Heaven, G-A-Y and The Fridge closed at around 2am to 3am on Sunday mornings, an hour or so before Trade opened at 3am. It took a while for clubbers to cotton on to the fact that they were able to go straight on to Trade to continue clubbing all night after the other clubs had closed. Once they did, Trade exploded into the phenomena it became.

At the time many guys went cruising in the parks after leaving other clubs. The name 'Trade' and the opening hours was to encourage guys to go to the club as a safer alternative.

Turnmills was the first club in the UK to be given a 24-hour "Music & Dance" licence. This was gained after Laurence Malice had for a long period of time tried to convince Newman that there was a need for people to be able to party in a safe environment after 3am. 

1995–2001
In the mid-late 1990s, Laurence decided to export the Trade brand internationally. Over the next few years, Trade held events throughout the UK and worldwide, in addition to releasing a number of CDs.

For New Years Eve, 1995, Trade were unable to hold their New Year's Eve party at Turnmills. This happened because New Year's Eve 1995 fell on a Sunday and the usual Turnmills Sunday night club - FF - held their NYE night at Turnmills. Trade held a successful New Years Day party at the Leisure Lounge in Holborn, London instead.

In 1998, Trades popular DJ Tony De Vit died.

Due to the global success of Trade, UK Channel 4 television commissioned an hour-long documentary Trade the all-night bender which was broadcast on 9 August 1998 as part of the Queer Street series of programmes. It featured in the BBC2 programme "Gaytime TV" and also had a regular weekly radio show on Atlantic252.

On May 27, 1999, Turnmills ended Trade'''s residency due to security problems at the previous week's event. Trade negotiated a 4-week run at LA2 in the London Astoria. During this time the management of Trade and Turnmills resolved the issues. Trade returned to Turnmills on July 3, 1999, for the post Mardi Gras (the renamed London Gay Pride) party. The following month on August 7, 1999, Trade had a dance tent at Summer Rites in Brockwell Park, the first time they had a tent at the festival.

Towards the end of the 1990s, as Turnmills fitted out more space in the venue, Trade expanded into a second room, which Laurence named the 'Trade lite lounge'. The room played a lighter funkier style of house music which quickly gained a big following.

In 2000, Trade hosted one of the two main stages (the other BBC Radio 1) for the first UK Love Parade festival held at Roundhay Park, Leeds the event was attended by 1,500,000 people.

 2002 onwards Trade ended its weekly London Sunday slot at Turnmills on October 27, 2002, on Trades 12th Birthday.

Trade Final at Turnmills 
Towards the end of Trade’s existence, Laurence had already realised the club had become a victim of its own popularity. ‘With Trade it became difficult to live up to some peoples’ expectations, and certain members of the Trade family didn’t want things to change and wanted to influence how the party should be. It’s a massive compliment that people loved Trade so much, but it comes with pressure as it has to live up to expectations…’ On January 18, 2008, Trade released a press statement announcing that the final Trade event at Turnmills would be held on March 22/23, 2008. This was due to the expected closure of Turnmills as a clubbing venue. The news was subsequently confirmed on January 24, 2008, when Turnmills officially announced the venue's closure. A further press release on January 30, 2008, announced that the final date was being brought forward by one week to Sunday, March 16, 2008. This was due to "so many 'sell out' events at Turnmills over Easter it would not be practical to run Trade After-Hours over this weekend". Within a few weeks of the tickets going on sale, the event sold out.

One week before Trade the Final happened, Laurence was interviewed live on Gaydar Radio by Dj Gary H in a two-hour, two-part documentary in which he talks about his music career and Trade, and how it all started, the highs and lows, and everything else in between.

Many of the original Trade DJs returned for the final event, including Steve Thomas, Ian M, Daz Saund, Malcolm Duffy, Pete Wardman and Fergie. The club opened its doors at 05:00 and during the night Laurence made a speech in the main room, thanking the clubbers and his associates, and asking everyone 'to really go for it!'. The party continued until the final record, Schöneberg by Marmion, was played by Pete Wardman, finishing at 17:45.

The Turnmills building has now been demolished and in its place stands a six-storey office.

25th Anniversary, History - The Final 
On October 25, 2015, Trade held its 25th birthday anniversary celebration and final party at Egg LDN, billed as 'History - The Final'. Nicole Moudaber and Nina Kraviz were among the headliners that played during the evening. The event brought together former resident and guest DJ's who had played at Trade during its 25-year history.

After Trade closed, Laurence commissioned Iain from Big Bang to write a script for a stage production tentatively titled: TRADE – the Musical. Iain has completed a script, although the project has yet to move forward. 

Trade was to have celebrated its 30th birthday in 2020 by co-hosting an event at Printworks in London, but due to the COVID-19 restrictions the event was postponed.

DJs 
The original Trade resident DJs were, Martin Confusion, Daz Saund, Trevor Rockliffe, Smokin Jo, and Malcolm Duffy, These were followed most notably by the late Tony De Vit, but also Tall Paul, Alan Thompson, Steve Thomas, Pete Wardman , Ian M, and Fergie
  
Other DJs who have graced the decks include:

Special guest DJ's invited to play at Trade events have included Frankie Knuckles, David Morales and Danny Tenaglia.

Trade Décor/Artwork 
To decorate the interior of the club, fluorescent banners and wall-hangings were used, illuminated by ultra violet lighting. When Laurence brought Tim Stabler on board, Tim produced some amazing interior décor for the club. Laurence also commissioned the artists TradeMark (Mark Wardell), Martin ‘B-Art’ Brown, and Mark McKenzie to create many of the images and artworks used over the years for the interior of the club and for advertising and promotions.

Laurence Malice (promoter) 
 This section may require its own biography page e.g. Laurence Malice (club promoter)
Laurence Mullane, known professionally as Laurence Malice, was born in the East End of London. His parents originated from Ireland, and he grew up in a traditional Catholic household. He attended a comprehensive Catholic school where he excelled in art. His aspirations of furthering his art studies were dashed when he discovered he was colour blind. Laurence left school at 16 and entered the law profession working as an articled clerk in the Probate Office at a Bishopsgate law firm. After almost two years working in law, Laurence resigned and took a sabbatical, which led to him changing his career path. Laurence has since worked in the entertainment industry for most of his life. ‘I started acting at the age of about seventeen in Holland. From there, I went to Australia, where I got my Equity card. I worked on a few movies and did commercials, milk ads, and puerile stuff like that.’ It was in Australia that Laurence first began putting on parties, although being a club promoter was not the initial appeal. ‘I was more into putting on different styles of parties. My passion has always been doing something a bit different, a bit quirky.’ Laurence also made a small appearance in the popular Australian TV drama The Sullivans. Laurence remained in Australia for around eighteen months, living in Sydney, Perth, and Melbourne, and it was in Australia that Laurence formed his first band, Larry Malice & The Razor Sharps.

Upon Laurence’s return to London in the early 1980s, he began hosting parties at different city venues. He ran events at a Sauna in Swiss Cottage and called it The Kiss Club. ‘It was the first place in England to play hip-hop music, and I used to run it with the guys who later became Renegade Soundwave.’ Laurence admits making money from such ventures was always a long way off, though.
‘The parties were always secondary. I was going from job to job working in theatre and as a wholefood buyer, and I was in a band. At the time, people like Steve Strange were running nightclubs, and I didn’t really see myself as a Steve Strange type character, but I was really into music; I suppose because I was a songwriter.’ Laurence has been in three bands including, You, You, You, and Big Bang. 

In 1984, Laurence was featured in the West End musical spectacular ‘Y’ at London’s Piccadilly Theatre, as a performing waiter in which he had a solo tap dancing and MC spot. The production starred Arturo Brachetti, and Laurence appeared in it for several months. Sometime after this, Laurence started putting on fashion shows in America, which were termed ‘wearable art for durable people’. ‘At that time, fashion was very important, and I wanted to take the catwalk and introduce it into a club environment, so about twenty of us would go to New York once a month and wreak havoc.’ The group included Spider from The Pogues, and after the party, the gang would hang out in after-hours clubs like the Paradise Garage. ‘We used to attract top celebrities. I was hanging out with people like Iggy Pop, David Bowie, and Andy Warhol. They used to come to the fashion shows because they were so different. I was never in it for the money we just did it for the lig.’ Another fashion show Laurence produced, An Esoteric Extravaganza, was requested by Dianne Brill ‘Queen of New York’s nightlife’ for her trendy New York hotspot Danceteria that her boyfriend, Rudolph, owned.

Laurence then hosted Pyramid at London’s Heaven, where he hired the up and coming DJ’s Mark Moore, later of S-Express, and Colin Faver. ‘It was the first place in England to play house music.’ Commercial recognition followed when his band, Big Bang, scored a couple of dance hits, which then indirectly led to his first club Xanadu at Turnmills. Turnmills was literally down the road from Big Bang’s agent, 10 X Better, whose office was in Clerkenwell Road. After a meeting one day at 10 X Better, Big Bang popped into Turnmills with their agent for lunch. That was how Laurence discovered Turnmills. That was in the winter of 1989/1990. Soon after, Laurence hosted his first club night Xanadu at Turnmills, which he ran with Robert Pereno. Xanadu attracted a strong following from day one.

Celebrity patrons 
Trade has attracted some well-known celebrities over the years including Madonna, Bjork, Kate Moss, Marc Almond, Rupert Everett, Alexander McQueen, John Galliano. The club's policy was to afford them no special VIP area nor could they bring in entourages. Those expecting this, such as Cher, and Axl Rose, were refused entry.

Trade (after Turnmills) 
Since 2008, Laurence and the promotion team behind the Trade brand have continued to run one-off specials around the UK and the world.

After Trade closed, Laurence opened a new club called Egg in Kings Cross, London. In May 2003, EGG won the prestigious BEDA Award for Best Club in London. In 2018, EGG LDN announced a world tour.

Further reading
 A History of London’s Nightlife Characters
 In Pictures: Memorabilia From Trade
 Afterhour clubs
 Superclub
 Trade (gay slang)
 Egg London

References

Sources

External links
 Getty Images Laurence Malice
 Trademark Art

Music venues completed in 1990
1990 establishments in England
LGBT nightclubs in London
Defunct LGBT nightclubs